Cliff Dexter is a detective series in the ZDF 1966 until 1968. It produced two seasons each with 13 episodes each 25 minutes, lead actor was Hans von Borsody. Other performers have included Hans Schellbach as Commissioner Meinert, Sabine Bethmann as Jacqueline and Andrea Dahmen as Carrol. In two episodes occurred Günter Strack.

Cliff Dexter is a former FBI agent who - working as a private investigator - in a German city. Parts of the series were filmed in Hamburg, including the startup sequence, runs in his Mercedes Benz 300 SE convertible to his office located at Ludwig-Erhard-Straße 22, 20459 Hamburg. (formerly Ost-West Straße)

The series was, although popular with audiences, not continued after 26 episodes, probably partly because the critics had little good to say about the 'pocket-format Bond'. Yet during the broadcast period 1966–1968, the series regularly reached 36-38 million viewers.

Main cast
 Hans von Borsody as Cliff Dexter (26 episodes)
 Andrea Dahmen as Carroll (13 episodes)
 Sabine Bethmann as Jacqueline (13 episodes)
 Eva Gross as Empfangssekretärin (13 episodes)
 Hans Waldherr as  Bob (13 episodes)
 Hans Schellbach as Kommissar Meinert (12 episodes)
 Herbert F. Schubert as  Paul (12 episodes)
 Hans Irle as Archibald Pillow (10 episodes)
 Achim Thorwald as Kriminalist Marquard (6 episodes)

See also
List of German television series

Bibliography
 Martin Compart. Crime TV: Lexikon der Krimiserien. Bertz, 2000.

External links
 

German crime television series
1966 German television series debuts
1968 German television series endings
German-language television shows
ZDF original programming